Jamie Searle  (born 25 November 2000) is a New Zealand footballer who plays as a goalkeeper for Barnsley. He was part of the New Zealand team  in the football competition at the 2020 Summer Olympics.

Early life
Searle was born in 2000 in Whakatāne, and played for Whakatāne Town, Tauranga City and Cambridge FC in his early years. He completed his secondary education at St Peter's School in Cambridge, south-east of Hamilton.

Club career

Melville United and Aston Villa
Searle began to play for the first team of Melville United during his time at school, making three appearances over three years.

Searle's manager at Melville United, Sam Wilkinson, organised a month-long trial with Aston Villa, and after impressing in friendly matches he signed his first professional contract in August 2019. For the first half-year, either his father or his mother was living with him in Birmingham; since the beginning of the COVID-19 pandemic, he has lived on his own.

Swansea City
After his time at Aston Villa, Searle trialled for Blackpool, Sunderland and Swansea City; in July 2020, he signed a one-year contract with Swansea. On 15 June 2021, he signed a one-year extension, with a club option to extend for another season.  He was released by Swansea City at the end of his contract on 30 June 2022.

Barnsley
On 16 June 2022, Searle agreed to join League One club Barnsley on a two-year deal upon the expiration of his Swansea City contract.

References

Living people
2000 births
New Zealand association footballers
Association football goalkeepers
Footballers at the 2020 Summer Olympics
Olympic association footballers of New Zealand
Aston Villa F.C. players
Swansea City A.F.C. players
Barnsley F.C. players
New Zealand expatriate association footballers
New Zealand expatriate sportspeople in England
Expatriate footballers in England
New Zealand expatriates in Wales
Expatriate footballers in Wales